Michael Pascal Hengartner  is an academic psychologist at the Zurich University of Applied Sciences who has published on the subject of antidepressants and in other areas. In 2022, he published a book called Evidence-Biased Antidepressant Prescription: Overmedicalisation, Flawed Research, and Conflicts of Interest. He has also published with other notable researchers such as Joanna Moncrieff and Irving Kirsch.

Selected publications

Books

Papers

References

External links
 Dr. Michael Pascal Hengartner - Zurich University of Applied Sciences (ZHAW)
 Michael P. Hengartner, PhD - Twitter
 Michael P. Hengartner - Google Scholar
 Michael Pascal Hengartner - ResearchGate
 Michael P Hengartner - ORCID

Living people
Swiss medical researchers
Swiss psychologists
Year of birth missing (living people)